This is a list of the Dutch Top 40 number-one singles of 2008.

Number-one artists

See also
2008 in music

2008 in the Netherlands
Netherlands
2008